Cheney  is a city in Sedgwick County, Kansas, United States.  As of the 2020 census, the population of the city was 2,181.

History
Cheney was founded in August, 1883. It was named for Benjamin P. Cheney, stockholder of the Atchison, Topeka and Santa Fe Railway.

Cheney was a station and shipping point on the Wichita & Pratt division of the Atchison, Topeka and Santa Fe Railway.

The first post office in Cheney was established in September 1883.

Geography
Cheney is located approximately 22 miles west of the outskirts of Wichita.

Climate
The climate in this area is characterized by hot, humid summers and generally mild to cool winters.  According to the Köppen Climate Classification system, Cheney has a humid subtropical climate, abbreviated "Cfa" on climate maps.

Demographics

2010 census
As of the census of 2010, there were 2,094 people, 773 households, and 563 families residing in the city. The racial makeup of the city was 97.3% White, 0.3% African American, 0.5% Native American, 0.5% from other races, and 1.3% from two or more races. Hispanic or Latino of any race were 2.5% of the population.

There were 773 households, of which 40.6% had children under the age of 18 living with them, 55.5% were married couples living together, 11.3% had a female householder with no husband present, 6.1% had a male householder with no wife present, and 27.2% were non-families. 24.3% of all households were made up of individuals, and 12% had someone living alone who was 65 years of age or older. The average household size was 2.64 and the average family size was 3.12.

The median age in the city was 35.6 years. 30.8% of residents were under the age of 18; 6.5% were between the ages of 18 and 24; 25.6% were from 25 to 44; 22.7% were from 45 to 64; and 14.3% were 65 years of age or older. The gender makeup of the city was 48.3% male and 51.7% female.

2000 census
As of the census of 2000, there were 1,783 people, 664 households, and 476 families residing in the city. The racial makeup of the city was 97.76% White, 0.67% Native American, 0.22% from other races, and 1.35% from two or more races. Hispanic or Latino of any race were 1.29% of the population.

There were 664 households, out of which 40.7% had children under the age of 18 living with them, 61.0% were married couples living together, 7.5% had a female householder with no husband present, and 28.3% were non-families. 26.4% of all households were made up of individuals, and 13.4% had someone living alone who was 65 years of age or older. The average household size was 2.60 and the average family size was 3.17.

In the city, the population was spread out, with 31.1% under the age of 18, 6.1% from 18 to 24, 29.5% from 25 to 44, 17.5% from 45 to 64, and 15.8% who were 65 years of age or older. The median age was 36 years. For every 100 females, there were 93.8 males. For every 100 females age 18 and over, there were 88.6 males.

The median income for a household in the city was $45,221, and the median income for a family was $51,591. Males had a median income of $40,313 versus $24,896 for females. The per capita income for the city was $18,783. About 0.6% of families and 2.0% of the population were below the poverty line, including 1.1% of those under age 18 and 1.6% of those age 65 or over.

Area events
 Sedgwick County Fair

Area attractions
 Souders Historical Museum
 Cheney State Park and Cheney Reservoir

Education
The community is served by Cheney USD 268 public school district, which operates three separate schools:
 Cheney High School
 Cheney Middle School
 Cheney Elementary School
Private schools
 St. Paul's Lutheran Church & School

The Cheney Cardinals have won the following Kansas State High School Championships:
 1977 Boys Track and Field - Class 2A
 1989 Girls Track and Field - Class 3A
 1990 Girls Track and Field - Class 3A
 1994 Boys Track and Field - Class 3A
 2000 Boys Track and Field - Class 3A
 2010 Girls Basketball - Class 4A
 2013 Girl Golf - Class 3-2-1A
 2014 Girls Track and Field - Class 3A
 2020 Girls Basketball Forever four - Class 3A
 2021 Girls Basketball - Class 3A
 2021 Girls Softball - Class 3A

References

Further reading

External links

 City of Cheney
 Cheney - Directory of Public Officials
 Cheney city map, KDOT

Cities in Kansas
Cities in Sedgwick County, Kansas
Wichita, KS Metropolitan Statistical Area